César Charlone Rodríguez (5 October 1895, in Montevideo – 8 May 1973) was a Uruguayan political figure.

Background

Charlone was prominent member of the Uruguayan Colorado Party during the 1930s. He was Minister of Finance from 1934 to 1938.

Vice President of Uruguay

He was Vice President of Uruguay, and served from 1938 to 1943 under President Alfredo Baldomir. At the same time he was President of the Senate of Uruguay. He also held the portfolio of Minister of Finance from 1940 to 1943.

Post Vice-Presidency

Charlone later served as Foreign Minister of Uruguay from 1949 until 1950 in the government of President of Uruguay Luis Batlle Berres.

He was Minister of Economy and Finance 1967–1971 in the Government of President of Uruguay Jorge Pacheco Areco.

He died on 8 May 1973, aged 77.

See also
 Gabriel Terra
 Vice President of Uruguay
 Politics of Uruguay

References

1895 births
1973 deaths
Politicians from Montevideo
Uruguayan people of Italian descent
Colorado Party (Uruguay) politicians
Vice presidents of Uruguay
Presidents of the Senate of Uruguay
Uruguayan vice-presidential candidates
Ministers of Economics and Finance of Uruguay